Leon Mazurek (28 February 1906 – 1 January 1940) was a Polish wrestler. He competed in the men's Greco-Roman featherweight at the 1928 Summer Olympics.

References

External links
 

1906 births
1940 deaths
Polish male sport wrestlers
Olympic wrestlers of Poland
Wrestlers at the 1928 Summer Olympics
Sportspeople from Ruda Śląska